This article lists notable people who died from or were diagnosed with colorectal cancer.

 Adele Roberts (born 1979), English broadcaster, radio personality and DJ.
 Alto Reed (1948–2020; aged 72), American saxophonist best known as a long-time member of Bob Seger and the Silver Bullet Band.
 Angela Scoular (1945–2011; aged 65), British actress (On Her Majesty's Secret Service).
 Antonin Artaud (1896–1948; aged 51), French dramatist, poet, essayist, actor,and theatre director; died from an overdose of chloral hydrate his doctor prescribed to control the pain from a very advanced and inoperable rectal cancer.
 Audrey Hepburn (1929–1993; aged 63), British actress and humanitarian.
 Babe Didrikson Zaharias (1911–1956; aged 45), American athlete.
 Billy Kametz (1987–2022; aged 35), American voice actor.
 Bob Jenkins (1947–2021; aged 73), American television and radio sports announcer.
 Bobby Moore (1941–1993; aged 51), England football captain and 1966 World Cup winner; the Bobby Moore Fund for Cancer Research UK is committed to beating bowel cancer in his memory.
 Brion Gysin (1916–1986; aged 70), British-Canadian writer and painter, was diagnosed with colorectal cancer in 1974 and underwent a colostomy; died from lung cancer in 1986.
 Carmen Marc Valvo (born 1963), American fashion designer.
 Chadwick Boseman (1976–2020; aged 43), American actor (Black Panther); died 3–4 years after diagnosis.
 Charles M. Schulz (1922–2000; aged 77), creator of Peanuts; died 60 days after diagnosis.
 Claude Debussy (1862–1918; aged 55), French composer.
 Corazon Aquino (1933–2009; aged 76), 11th President of the Philippines (1986–1992); died after a 16-month battle with colon cancer.
 Dame Deborah James (1981–2022; aged 40), English journalist and podcast presenter (You, Me and the Big C).
 Eartha Kitt (1927–2008; aged 81), American singer and actress.
 Sir Edward Elgar (1857–1934; aged 76), English composer; died four months after diagnosis.
 Queen Elizabeth The Queen Mother (1900–2002; aged 101), British Queen Consort of King George VI and mother of Queen Elizabeth II and Princess Margaret, Countess of Snowdon. She was diagnosed with colon cancer in 1966 at the age of 66 and surgery removed a tumour; she survived and died 35 years later in 2002, aged 101, from natural causes.
 Elizabeth Montgomery (1933–1995; aged 62), American actress; eight weeks after diagnosis.
 Harold Wilson (1916–1995; aged 79), British politician who served as Prime Minister of the United Kingdom (1964–1970, 1974–1976).
 Howard Marks (1945–2016; aged 70), Welsh drug smuggler and author.
 Hugo Pratt (1927–1995; aged 68), Italian cartoonist (Corto Maltese).
 Jackie Gleason (1916–1987; aged 71), American actor and entertainer, best-known for portraying "Ralph Kramden" in The Honeymooners.
 Jay Monahan (1956–1998; aged 42), American attorney. His widow, Katie Couric, raised awareness of colorectal cancers after his death, encouraged people to get tested, and The Jay Monahan Center for Gastrointestinal Health was established in his memory at New York-Presbyterian/Weill Cornell.
 Dame Joan Bakewell (born 1933), English broadcaster, journalist, television presenter and Labour Party peer.
 Joel Siegel (1943–2007; aged 63), Emmy award-winning film critic and Entertainment Editor of ABC's Good Morning America.
 John Foster Dulles (1888–1959; aged 71), United States Secretary of State under Republican President Dwight D. Eisenhower.
 John Wetton (1949–2017; aged 67), British singer-songwriter.
 José Ferrer (1912–1992; aged 80), Puerto Rican actor, director and film director.
 John Bain (1984–2018; aged 33), English video gaming commentator and game critic, known as "TotalBiscuit".
 Dame Julie Walters (born 1950), English actress (Harry Potter, Mamma Mia!, Wood and Walters, National Treasure).
 Kevin Conroy (1955–2022; aged 66), American actor, known for voicing Batman in various DC Comics related properties for three decades.
 Kevin Corcoran (1949–2015; aged 66), American director, and producer who took part in various Disney films as a child actor.
 Kirstie Alley (1951–2022; aged 71), American actress (Cheers, Look Who's Talking, Celebrity Big Brother 22).
 Kornbread Jeté (born 1992), American drag queen and star of RuPaul's Drag Race (Season 14). Diagnosed with adenocarcinoma in 2022 aged 30.
 Lois Maxwell (1927–2007; aged 80), Canadian actress best-known for playing Miss Moneypenny in the first 14 James Bond films.
 Lynn Faulds Wood (1948–2020; aged 72), Scottish television presenter and journalist (BBC Watchdog). Survived advanced bowel cancer and founded the charities Beating Bowel Cancer and Lynn's Bowel Cancer Campaign. She later died from a stroke in 2020.
 Malcolm Marshall (1958–1999; aged 41), West Indian-British cricket player.
 Neville Chamberlain (1869–1940; aged 71), British politician who served as Prime Minister of the United Kingdom (1937–1940). 
 Norma Tanega (1939–2019; aged 80) American folk and pop singer-songwriter, painter, and experimental musician. 
 Pelé (1940–2022; aged 82), former Brazilian footballer for Santos FC, New York Cosmos and Brazil. He was diagnosed in 2021 at age 81.
 Robin Gibb (1949–2012; aged 62), Manx singer, musician and producer, member of the Bee Gees.
 Rod Roddy (1937–2003; aged 66), American radio and television announcer (The Price is Right); died two years after being diagnosed with colon cancer.
 Ronald Reagan (1911–2004; aged 93), American politician who served as the 40th President of the United States (1981–1989). In 1985, Reagan underwent surgery at Bethesda Naval Hospital, he had a right Hemicolectomy, he had two foot of colon removed. This was found to be a Dukes' Stage B colorectal cancer. 
 Russi Taylor (1944–2019; aged 75), American voice actress best known as the voice of Minnie Mouse.
 Sam Simon (1955–2015; aged 59), American director, producer, writer, philanthropist and co-creator of The Simpsons.
 Sam Taylor-Johnson (born 1967), English filmmaker, director and photographer.
 Sara Murray Jordan (1884–1959; aged 75), American gastroenterologist; diagnosed herself with colon cancer and died in 1959.
 Sharon Osbourne (born 1952), British-American television personality and music manager (The X Factor, The Osbournes, America's Got Talent).
 Sid Waddell (1940–2012; aged 72), English sports commentator and television personality, known as the "Voice of Darts"; died 11 months after diagnosis.
 Simon MacCorkindale (1952–2010; aged 58), British actor and film director; first diagnosed in 2006.
 Sonya Biddle (1957–2022; aged 64), Canadian actress and politician in Montreal, Quebec. She served on the Montreal City Council from 1998 to 2001 as a Member of Vision Montreal.
 Tina Turner (born 1939), American singer and actress ("Proud Mary", "Nutbush City Limits", "What's Love Got to Do with It", "The Best").
 Tony Snow (1955–2008; aged 53), American journalist and politician who served as the 25th White House Press Secretary under President George W. Bush.
 Vince Lombardi (1913–1970; aged 57), American football coach of Green Bay Packers and Washington Redskins. The Super Bowl trophy was renamed in his honor shortly after his death, as his Packers won the first two Super Bowls.

References 

 
Colorectal cancer